One Crimson Night is a two-disc live album and DVD by Swedish power metal band HammerFall. The album was recorded during band's concert at Lisebergshallen, Sweden. DVD containing this live footage along with bonus materials was released by Nuclear Blast on 29 June 2004.

The cover artwork was created by Samwise Didier.

Track listing

DVD
"Lore of the Arcane"
"Riders of the Storm"
"Heeding the Call"
"Stone Cold"
"Hero's Return"
"Legacy of Kings"
"Bass solo: Magnus Rosén"
"At the End of the Rainbow"
"The Way of the Warrior"
"The Unforgiving Blade"
"Glory to the Brave"
"Guitar solo: Stefan Elmgren"
"Let the Hammer Fall"
"Renegade"
"Steel Meets Steel"
"Crimson Thunder"
"Templars of Steel"
"Gold Album Award"
"Hearts on Fire"
"HammerFall"

Bonus materials
On the Road Documentary by Bosse Holmberg
Photo Galleries
Subtitles

Disc one
"Lore of the Arcane" – 1:44
"Riders of the Storm" – 4:54
"Heeding the Call" – 5:00
"Stone Cold" – 7:10
"Hero's Return" – 4:37
"Legacy of Kings" – 4:45
"Bass solo: Magnus Rosén" – 3:37
"At the End of the Rainbow" – 4:33
"The Way of the Warrior" – 4:03
"The Unforgiving Blade" – 3:49
"Glory to the Brave" – 6:35
"Guitar solo: Stefan Elmgren" – 2:43
"Let the Hammer Fall" – 5:50

Disc two
"Renegade" – 3:54
"Steel Meets Steel" – 4:37
"Crimson Thunder" – 7:29
"Templars of Steel" – 6:10
"Hearts on Fire" – 4:03
"HammerFall" – 8:24
"The Dragon Lies Bleeding" (bonus track) – 5:06
"Stronger Than All" (bonus track) – 4:29
"A Legend Reborn" (bonus track) – 5:10

Production
During the post-production of DVD, sound level of the audience who repeats Joacim Cans' vocals and sings with him was lowered so that it looks like there's no response from it. On the CD, however, original sound level is preserved.
Bonus Tracks #7 and #9 in the CD were recorded in Guadalajara, Mexico. Track #8 recorded in Santiago, Chile.

Personnel
Joacim Cans – lead vocals
Oscar Dronjak – guitars, backing vocals
Stefan Elmgren – guitars, backing vocals
Magnus Rosén – bass guitar
Anders Johansson – drums

Release information
Also released as limited edition (1,000 pieces) box set containing this 2CD, the DVD "One Crimson Night", a flag, backstage pass and a bonus CD with the following track list: Dreamland (live), Joacim's Message, Oscar's Message, Stefan's Message, Magnus' Message, Anders' Message.

References

External links

Album information
DVD information

HammerFall albums
HammerFall video albums
2003 live albums
2003 video albums
Nuclear Blast live albums
Nuclear Blast video albums
Live video albums
Albums produced by Fredrik Nordström